Coprosma arborea is a species found in New Zealand, traditionally known in Māori by the name mamangi. The flowers have insignificant petals and are wind pollinated, with long anthers and stigmas. The fruit is a non-poisonous juicy berry, containing two small seeds. A typical occurrence location of the species is in the Hamilton Ecological District in New Zealand's North Island.

Tree up to c. 10 m. tall; trunk 2-4 dm. diam.; branches rather close-set; branchlets slender, pubescent. Lvs on petioles winged in upper half, (8)-12-(20) mm. long. Stipules short, triangular, connate near base, ciliolate, with prominent denticle. Lamina rather thin, glab., ovate to broad-elliptic to oblong, sts suborbicular; apex rounded or retuse, sts apiculate or mucronulate; cuneately or abruptly narrowed to petiole; margins thickened, indistinctly waved, often subcrenulate; ± 50-60 × 35-40 mm.; lvs on young plants smaller, lamina ± 15-25 × 10-17 mm. Reticulations obscure above, us. distinct below. ♂ in dense glomerules, terminal on main and axillary branches; calyx-teeth linear, obtuse, ciliolate; corolla funnelform, lobes ovoid, acute, ± = tube. ♀ in clusters of 2–4; calyx-teeth obtuse, ciliolate; corolla-tube short, lobes long, acute. Drupe white, broad-oblong, c. 7 mm. long.

References
 H.H. Allen. 2009. Flora of New Zealand, Volume 1: Coprosma
 C. Michael Hogan. 2009. Crown Fern: Blechnum discolor, Globaltwitcher.com, ed. N. Stromberg

Line notes

arborea
Flora of New Zealand